The Province of Foggia is a province in the Apulia (Puglia) region of southern Italy.

This province is also known as Daunia, after the Daunians, an Iapygian pre-Roman tribe living in Tavoliere plain, and as Capitanata, derived from Catapanata, since the area was governed by a catepan as part of the Catepanate of Italy during the High Middle Ages. Its capital is the city of Foggia.

Geography
The province of Foggia can be divided in three parts: one centered on its capital called Tavoliere, another along the Apennines named Daunian Mountains and the third on the spur of the boot-shaped Italian peninsula called Gargano.

The Tavoliere is an important agricultural area: grapefruit, olives, durum wheat and tomato are the chief products. It is called "the granary of Italy" because of its significant wheat production.

Daunian Mountains lie along the border with Molise and Campania. Scattered with small villages, the mountains are covered by forests and pastures, with the main produce being hams and caciocavallo cheese. Faetar, a language descended from Franco-Provençal, is spoken in two villages: Faeto and Celle di San Vito.

The Gargano peninsula is partially mountainous and partially forested, Foresta Umbra with vegetation typical of Central Europe, the only part of the ancient Black Forest remaining in Italy. Allegedly its name comes from the word ombra (shadow) because of its density that prevents light from entering. The coast of Gargano has many beaches and tourist facilities. In the north are two major salt lakes Lesina and Varano. It produces olives, olive oil and typical mountain and seafood items.

Population
There are currently 61 comuni (singular: comune) in the province, see Comuni of the Province of Foggia.

Population centers

Main centers in the province are:
Foggia, the capital and native city of opera composer Umberto Giordano. Favourite residence in Apulia of Frederick II at the beginning of the 13th century. During his reign it was the most important town of the province and to alternate periods of the Empire.
San Severo, the old capital and city of comics artist Andrea Pazienza.
San Giovanni Rotondo, home of Padre Pio and place of the church devoted to him.
Manfredonia and Vieste archiepiscopal see of Apulia.
Vieste, Mattinata and Peschici, notable sea-side resorts.
Lucera, one of the residence of Frederick II.

Other centers of interest are:
Cerignola, native town of philologist Nicola Zingarelli founder of the Zingarelli Italian dictionary and syndicalist Giuseppe Di Vittorio
Torremaggiore, and the native town of Nicola Sacco
Troia, site of a 10th century cathedral, refounded by Byzantine Katepan Basil Boioannes in the early 11th Century.
Celle di San Vito and Faeto, two towns where an extremely rare daughter language of the Franco-Provençal language has been spoken since the 14th century. The dialect, Faetar-Cigliàje, is only spoken by less than 1,400 people in the world.

Economy
Although less important today, the agricultural sector remains the mainstay of Foggia's economy; it is nicknamed the "granary of Italy". The few industries present are mostly devoted to food processing.

Most peeled tomatoes in Europe come from Foggia. Every year, two million tons of tomatoes are produced but farmers receive only eight cents per kilo. To survive in the free market, most tomato farmers recruit illegal immigrants.

Tourism
Foggia receives many Catholic pilgrims each year to locations such as the Sanctuary of Saint Michael the Archangel in Monte Sant'Angelo which was visited by Pope John Paul II in 1987 and to nearby San Giovanni Rotondo the home of Saint Pio of Pietrelcina from 1916 until his death in 1968.

See also
Daunia,  historical region and people in the 7th through 5th centuries BC

References

External links
 Official website (in Italian)
 Foggia web portal
 Foggia news
 Centro Studi Naturalistici

 
Foggia